62 Andromedae, abbreviated 62 And, is a single star in the northern constellation Andromeda. 62 Andromedae is the Flamsteed designation; it also bears the Bayer designation of c Andromedae. It is bright enough to be seen by the naked eye, with an apparent magnitude of 5.31.  Based upon parallax measurements made during the Gaia mission, it is at a distance of roughly 273 light-years (84 parsecs) from Earth. The star is moving closer to the Earth with a heliocentric radial velocity of −30 km/s, and is predicted to come to within  in 1,6 million years.

This is an A-type main-sequence star with a stellar classification of A0 V. Abt and Morrel (1995) gave it a class of A1 III, matching a more evolved giant star. The star has 2.42 times the mass of the Sun, about 1.8 times the Sun's radius, and is spinning with a projected rotational velocity of 86 km/s. It is radiating 45 times the Sun's luminosity from its photosphere at an effective temperature of 9,572 K.

References

A-type main-sequence stars
Andromeda (constellation)
Andromedae, c
BD+46 0552
Andromedae, 62
014212
010819
0670